Cross-polarization (CP), also known as proton-enhanced nuclear induction spectroscopy  is a solid-state nuclear magnetic resonance (ssNMR) technique to transfer nuclear magnetization from different types of nuclei via heteronuclear dipolar interactions. The 1H-X cross-polarization dramatically improves the sensitivity of ssNMR experiments of most experiments involving spin-1/2 nuclei, capitalizing on the higher 1H polarisation, and shorter T1(1H) relaxation times. It was developed by Michael Gibby, Alexander Pines and Professor John S. Waugh at the Massachusetts Institute of Technology. 

In this technique the natural nuclear polarization of an abundant spin (typically 1H) is exploited to increase the polarization of a rare spin (such as 13C, 15N, 31P) by irradiating the sample with radio waves at the frequencies matching the Hartmann–Hahn condition:

This process is sometimes referred to as "spin-locking". The power of one contact pulse is typically ramped to achieve a more broadband and efficient magnetisation transfer.

The evolution of the X NMR signal intensity during the cross polarisation is a build-up and decay process whose time axis is usually referred to as the "contact time". At short CP contact times, a build-up of X magnetisation occurs, during which the transfer of 1H magnetisation from nearby spins (and remote spins through proton spin diffusion) to X occurs. For longer CP contact times, the X magnetisation decreases from T1ρ(X) relaxation, i.e. the decay of the magnetisation during a spin lock.

References

Nuclear magnetic resonance
Spectroscopy